The 1923–24 season in Swedish football, starting August 1923 and ending July 1924:

Honours

Official titles

Competitions

Promotions, relegations and qualifications

Promotions

League transfers

Relegations

Domestic results

Division 1 Svenska Serien Östra 1923–24

Division 1 Svenska Serien Västra 1923–24

Svenska Serien play-off 1923–24

Allsvenskan qualification play-off 1923–24

Division 2 Uppsvenska Serien 1923–24

Division 2 Mellansvenska Serien 1923–24

Division 2 Östsvenska Serien 1923–24

Division 2 Västsvenska Serien 1923–24

Division 2 Sydsvenska Serien 1923–24

Svenska Mästerskapet 1923 
Final

National team results 

 Sweden: 

 Sweden: 

 Sweden: 

 Sweden: 

 Sweden: 

 Sweden: 

 Sweden: 

 Sweden: 

 Sweden: 

 Sweden: 

 Sweden: 

 Sweden: 

 Sweden: 

 Sweden:

National team players in season 1923/24

Notes

References 
Print

Online

 
Seasons in Swedish football
Swedish